Elizabeth L. Gardner (1921 – December 22, 2011) was an American pilot during World War II who served as a member of the Women Airforce Service Pilots (WASP). She was one of the first American female military pilots and the subject of a well-known photograph, sitting in the pilot's seat of a Martin B-26 Marauder.

In 2009, the 300 living WASP pilots were awarded a Congressional Gold Medal through a unit citation.

Early life and family 
Gardner was born in Rockford, Illinois, in 1921.  She graduated from Rockford High School in 1939. She was a mother and housewife before the war started. After she married, she took the last name Remba.

Military career 
Upon enlisting as a WASP member, Gardner "had two days of training under Lieutenant Col. Paul Tibbets, who later commanded the B-29 that dropped the first atom bomb on Hiroshima". She was the subject of an often-reproduced historical photo when she was about 22; the original is held at the National Archives. The photograph became emblematic of the place of women in the service of their country.

Gardner flew Martin B-26 Marauder medium bombers, including the AT-23 trainer version of the bomber. One of her stations was in Dodge City, Kansas. She was trained as a test pilot and flight instructor, and she also flew aircraft that towed aerial targets.

After years of fighting for recognition of their military service, WASP members were recognized with the Congressional Gold Medal in 2009.

Later life and legacy 

In December 1944, the government disbanded WASP, and Gardner returned to the private sector. She was a commercial pilot after World War II, flying for Piper Aircraft Corporation in Pennsylvania. In that capacity, she became involved in public relations, using her piloting skills to ferry Piper customers, meeting with the Department of Defense, and writing all of William T. Piper's speeches.

Gardner worked as a test pilot after the war, including for General Textile Mills, which was working on an aircraft parachute that was intended to safely land aircraft that became disabled in flight. She participated in at least two tests with the device in December 1945, both of which forced her to bail out of the aircraft when the parachute became tangled in the test aircraft. During the second incident, the aircraft entered a dive when its elevators were jammed by the parachute; Gardner escaped from the cockpit, but she was only  from the ground when her own parachute opened.

She died in New York on December 22, 2011. Rockford, Illinois held a mural festival downtown in 2019 and included a mural by Ohio artists Jenny Roesel Ustick and Atalie Gagnet based on Gardner's time as a WASP.

References

Notes

Citations

Bibliography

 
 
 .

External links

 

1921 births
2011 deaths
Congressional Gold Medal recipients
People from Rockford, Illinois
Military personnel from Illinois
Women Airforce Service Pilots personnel
People notable for being the subject of a specific photograph
21st-century American women